Roger Jay Young (born May 21, 1953) is a retired American cyclist. He was part of the United States team that won a gold medal in the 4000 m pursuit at the 1975 Pan American Games. He competed at the 1972 Summer Olympics in the sprint, but failed to reach the final. In 1973 he won the national title in track sprint.

After retirement from competitions he works as a cycling coach. He's married to movie producer Elaine Dysinger. Roger's sister Sheila Young, was a world top competitor both in speed skating and cycling.

References

1953 births
Living people
Cyclists at the 1972 Summer Olympics
American male cyclists
Sportspeople from Pontiac, Michigan
Olympic cyclists of the United States

Pan American Games gold medalists for the United States
Pan American Games medalists in cycling
Cyclists at the 1975 Pan American Games
Medalists at the 1975 Pan American Games